Teddy Bears' Picnic is a 2002 American comedy film written and directed by Harry Shearer. It was released in May 2002 to limited audiences. Shearer has a small role in the film. It is also Kenneth Mars' last film before his death.

Plot

Teddy Bears' Picnic covers an annual encampment of prominent male leaders at the Zambezi Glen.

The film starts out with the first ever women's day at the glen, where wives and girlfriends of Zambezi members are invited to visit the glen ahead of the annual encampment, which also serves to introduce the glen and the characters to the audience. The actual retreat itself begins after the members have returned without any women and kicks off with the "Assassination of Time", based on the real Cremation of Care at the Bohemian Grove, with a pelican replacing the latter's owl. After that, the festivities begin, including an all-male chorus line in drag, which is photographed by one of the club employees who smuggles out the pictures to the news media.

This violation of the privacy of the glen causes the leaders of the membership to work on spin control, while the employee who took the pictures is emboldened by his success and the promise of a hefty reward to record footage of the glen with a camera smuggled in with the help of a local newscaster. In this time we also see what members do to enjoy themselves at the retreat, including drinking, urinating on trees while naked, and visiting nearby prostitutes.

After filming some of the activities at the glen, the cameraman is spotted by some members and flees into the woods. From here, the members invoke their privilege and connections, with disastrous results.  The members call in the military to track down the cameraman with dogs, flares, and helicopters, which sets off a forest fire. When the road out of the glen is blocked by an overturned truck filled with drinks for the glen members, one of the characters orders his chauffeur to drive through anyway, making the blockage worse. A helicopter flying without lights at night at the behest of one of the members collides with a news helicopter covering the fire.

Cast

Production
Harry Shearer wrote, directed, and executive-directed the film. He hired old friends and colleagues (Michael McKean, Howard Hesseman, and Fred Willard) and younger performers (Annabelle Gurwitch as a camp follower and Justin Kirk as a disgruntled part-time employee who tries to smuggle videotape of the glen's strange rites to a local television station). He paid everyone "low-budget scale," Shearer said.

The film was shot in less than three weeks, at a cost of $800,000. Shearer funded the film; he said that the money came from the Fox Broadcasting Company, for his voiceover work on The Simpsons: "That's why there's a 'Thank You' to Rupert Murdoch at the end of the credits – it's his money, he just doesn't know it. It just kind of flowed through me."

The film was shot using high-definition video equipment. Cinematographer Jaime Reynoso shot the film; post-production work was done by Visionbox Pictures.

Distribution
The film was screened at the U.S. Comedy Arts Festival in February 2001, the USA Film Festival in April 2001 and at the St. Louis International Film Festival in November 2001. It had a limited released to theaters in March 2002.

Critical reception
The film has a 0% rating on Rotten Tomatoes based on reviews from 19 critics. On Metacritic, the film has a 32% rating based on reviews from 10 critics, indicating "generally unfavorable reviews".

Dave Kehr of The New York Times called it a "Fitfully entertaining molehill of a movie."

See also 
 Significant Others: a novel with a fictional portrayal of the Bohemian Grove

References

External links
 
 
 

2002 films
2002 comedy films
American comedy films
American satirical films
Films directed by Harry Shearer
Films with screenplays by Harry Shearer
Films shot in Los Angeles
Magnolia Pictures films
American independent films
American mockumentary films
2002 independent films
Bohemian Club
2000s English-language films
2000s American films